The 1955 FA Charity Shield was the 33rd FA Charity Shield, the annual football match played between the winners of the previous season's Football League and FA Cup competitions. It was contested between Chelsea, the reigning First Division champions, and Newcastle United, holders of the FA Cup. Chelsea won 3–0, thanks to second-half goals from Roy Bentley and Frank Blunstone, and an own goal from Alf McMichael.

Match details

See also
1954–55 Football League
1954–55 FA Cup

References

1955
Charity Shield 1955
Charity Shield 1955
Comm
Charity Shield